A Glint of Silver is an album by Silly Wizard released in 1986 on the Green Linnet Records label. This is final studio album recorded by the band.

Track listing
"Roarin' Donald/The Man Who Shot the Windmill/A Glint of Silver (4:19)"
"The Secret Portrait/Wha'll Be King But Cherlie? (6:15)"
"Lover's Heart (5:13)"
"When Summer Ends (4:20)"
"The Chill Eastern Winds (6:02)"
"Willie Archer (3:36)"
"Simon MacKenzie's Welcome to His Twin Sisters/Farewell to "The Heb" (3:27)"
"The Blackbird of Sweet Avondale (4:42)"

Personnel
Phil Cunningham - Accordion, whistle, keyboards, vocals
Johnny Cunningham - Fiddle, mandolin
Andy M. Stewart - Vocals, tenor banjo
Martin Hadden - Bass

References

1986 albums
Silly Wizard albums